Zapadnoye Degunino District  ( – Western Degunino) is an administrative district (raion) of Northern Administrative Okrug, and one of the 125 raions of Moscow, Russia. In 1997 the Businovo District was merged into the district.

See also
Administrative divisions of Moscow

References

Notes

Sources

Districts of Moscow
Northern Administrative Okrug